19-Norpregnane, also known as 13β-methyl-17β-ethylgonane, is a norsteroid and the 19-demethyl analogue of pregnane. It is the parent compound of 19-norprogesterone (19-norpregn-4-ene-3,20-dione) and derivatives of it such as the progestins demegestone, gestonorone caproate (gestronol hexanoate), nomegestrol acetate, norgestomet, promegestone, segesterone acetate (nestorone), and trimegestone.

See also
 Gonane
 Androstane
 Estrane

References

Norpregnanes